Autumn Moon is a 1992 film directed by Clara Law and written by Eddie Ling-Ching Fong.

A Hong Kong high school girl befriends a twenty-something Japanese man visiting Hong Kong.

The film stars Japanese actor Masatoshi Nagase therefore dialogue is a mixture of English, Cantonese, and Japanese. Hong Kong musician Tats Lau contributes to the film score.

See also
 List of Hong Kong films

External links
 

1992 films
1990s Cantonese-language films
Golden Leopard winners
Japanese romantic comedy films
Hong Kong romantic comedy films
Films directed by Clara Law
1992 romantic comedy films
1990s Japanese films
1990s Hong Kong films